Marc Nierga Martí (born 15 April 1992) is a Spanish footballer who plays for CD Calahorra as a forward.

Football career
Born in Girona, Catalonia, Nierga was a product of Real Zaragoza's youth system. He made his debuts as a senior with the reserves in the 2011–12 campaign, in Segunda División B.

On 5 June 2012 Nierga moved to another reserve team, CA Osasuna B also in the third level. On 29 January 2014, after suffering relegation, he joined Deportivo de La Coruña's B-side, in Tercera División.

On 18 June 2014 Nierga returned to the third division, signing for CD Guijuelo. After scoring 14 goals during the season, he joined Segunda División side AD Alcorcón on 13 June of the following year, along with Guijuelo teammate Răzvan Ochiroșii.

On 9 September 2015 Nierga made his professional debut, starting in a 0–1 home loss against SD Ponferradina, for the season's Copa del Rey. On 8 July of the following year, after contributing with only one appearance in the league, he rescinded his contract, and signed for Granada CF B four days later.

References

External links

1992 births
Living people
Sportspeople from Girona
Spanish footballers
Footballers from Catalonia
Association football forwards
Segunda División B players
Tercera División players
Real Zaragoza B players
CA Osasuna B players
Deportivo Fabril players
CD Guijuelo footballers
AD Alcorcón footballers
Club Recreativo Granada players
Lleida Esportiu footballers
UE Olot players
CD Ebro players
CD Calahorra players